The Rolls-Royce RB.145 was a British jet engine designed in the early-1960s by Rolls-Royce for use as a lightweight VTOL lift and cruise engine. Developed from the Rolls-Royce RB108 the RB.145 featured more accessories and a higher thrust rating. Six engines developed by MAN Turbo were fitted to the first prototype of the EWR VJ 101 experimental German fighter aircraft, achieving supersonic flight by July 1964.

Reheated versions of the RB.145 with a thrust of 3,650 lb (16.2 kN) were fitted to the second EWR VJ 101 with the intention of reaching Mach 1.4.

Variants
RB.145Standard un-reheated turbojet
RB.145R the RB.145 with reheat.

Applications
EWR VJ 101

Specifications (RB.145R)

See also

References

Further reading

External links

EADS - Image of EWR VJ 101 undergoing tethered reheat test

1960s turbojet engines
RB145
Lift jet